Robert L. Estrin (born 3 March 1942 in Lakewood, New Jersey) is an American film editor.

Career 
Estrin started his career in the 1970s. His first work was a documentary feature about the photographer Imogen Cunningham. Later he also edited feature films such as The Candidate (1972), Badlands (1973) and Memory of Us (1974). His last work was the cut of the 1995 comedy film The Perez Family.

Estrin's sister Sandra Adair also works as a film editor.

Selected filmography 
 1970: Imogen Cunningham, Photographer (documentary)
 1970: The Unexplained (documentary)
 1970: It Couldn't Be Done (documentary)
 1971: The Numbers Start with the River (short documentary)
 1971: Brazil: A Report on Torture (documentary)
 1972: The Candidate
 1973: Badlands
 1974: Memory of Us
 1976: Almos' a Man (short)
 1976: Pipe Dreams
 1978: Mirrors
 1982: CBS Afternoon Playhouse (TV series, one episode)
 1983: Breathless
 1985: Creation of the Universe (documentary)
 1985: Desert Hearts
 1986: What Happened to Kerouac? (documentary)
 1986: Maricela (TV movie)
 1987: Young Harry Houdini (TV movie)
 1988: Colors
 1990: Internal Affairs
 1991: The Cabinet of Dr. Ramirez
 1992: A River Runs Through It
 1995: The Perez Family

Awards 
For his cut of the documentary film Creation of the Universe Estrin was nominated for an Eddie Award of American Cinema Editors in 1985.

External links

References 

1942 births
Living people
American film editors